A.S.D. Portuense Etrusca (formerly A.S.D. Portuense) is an amateur Italian football club, based in Portomaggiore, Emilia-Romagna. The club is currently playing in Promozione Emilia-Romagna Group D.

Notable former players

 Paolo Mazza
 Ruben Buriani
 Savino Bellini
 Rino Micheli
 Arnaldo Taddei
 Silvio "Oberdan" Orlandi
 Giulio Boldrini
 Lidio Maietti
 Serafino Montanari
 Nello Orlandi

References

Football clubs in Emilia-Romagna